Janene Higgins is a graphic designer and video artist based in New York City. Her work spans several genres, from video performance in the experimental music scene to videos for Saks Fifth Avenue, and the design of several hundred CD packages for such record labels as Sony,  BMG, PolyGram, and a wide variety of independents.

Higgins moved to New York City to design magazines, working for such publications as Esquire, Working Woman, and Fame, culminating in three years as a designer for Vanity Fair magazine. While at VF, she began designing CD covers and videos for friends in the downtown music scene, which led to an ongoing series of music/video performance collaborations with some of New York's preeminent composers and improvisors of new music. These include duos with Elliott Sharp, Ikue Mori, Mari Kimura, Alan Licht, Nurit Tilles, Okkyung Lee, Aki Onda, and Zeena Parkins. She has directed several short experimental works, often with sound design by notable avant-garde artists including Sharp, Parkins, Christian Marclay and John Duncan. Projection design for theatre include the operas Binibon, Port Bou, and Filiseti Mekidesi. Her work has been performed and exhibited at The New York Video Festival at Lincoln Center; documenta in Kassel, Germany; The Kitchen, NYC; Musée d'art contemporain de Lyon; City of Women festival, Slovenia; The Chelsea Art Museum, NYC; HiTeca Festival in Porto, Portugal; Art Institute of Chicago; Konzerthaus Berlin; The Hamburg Short Film Festival; and at The Impakt Festival in The Netherlands.

Appearances on Film
 Roulette TV: Janene Higgins & Zeena Parkins. Roulette Intermedium Inc. (2001 DVD)
 Shadows Choose Their Horrors (2005) dir. Jennifer Reeves
 Elliott Sharp: Doing the Don't (2008 DVD documentary)

References

External links
 Experimental Television Center.
 Official Site: video art.
 Official Site: graphic design.
   The New York Times Review: Port Bou.
 The New York Press: "Suspension".
 

American graphic designers
Women graphic designers
American video artists
University at Albany, SUNY alumni
Living people
Artists from New York City
Year of birth missing (living people)